Primary gonococcal dermatitis is a rare infection of the skin that occurs after primary inoculation of the skin from an infected focus.

See also 
 Gonococcemia
 List of cutaneous conditions

References 

Bacterium-related cutaneous conditions